Luke Bambridge and Akira Santillan were the defending champions but chose not to defend their title.

Roberto Maytín and Fernando Romboli won the title after defeating Manuel Guinard and Arthur Rinderknech 6–7(5–7), 6–4, [11–9] in the final.

Seeds

Draw

References

External links
 Main draw

Savannah Challenger - Doubles
2019 Doubles